Climate change in Colorado encompasses the effects of climate change, attributed to man-made increases in atmospheric carbon dioxide, in the U.S. state of Colorado.

In 2019 The Denver Post reported that "[i]ndividuals living in southeastern Colorado are more vulnerable to potential health effects from climate change than residents in other parts of the state". The United States Environmental Protection Agency has more broadly reported:

"Colorado's climate is changing. Most of the state has warmed one or two degrees (F) in the last century. Throughout the western United States, heat waves are becoming more common, snow is melting earlier in spring, and less water flows through the Colorado River. Rising temperatures and recent droughts in the region have killed many trees by drying out soils, increasing the risk of forest fires, or enabling outbreaks of forest insects. In the coming decades, the changing climate is likely to decrease water availability and agricultural yields in Colorado, and further increase the risk of wildfires".

Snowpack

"Changes in temperature and precipitation are affecting snowpack—the amount of snow that accumulates on the ground. In most of the West, snowpack  has decreased since the 1950s, due to earlier melting and less precipitation falling as snow. The amount of snowpack measured in April has declined by 20 to 60 percent at most monitoring sites in Colorado".

"Diminishing snowpack can shorten the season for skiing and other forms of winter tourism and recreation. It also enables subalpine fir and other high-altitude trees to grow at higher elevations. The upward movement of the tree line will shrink the extent of alpine tundra and fragment these ecosystems, possibly causing the loss of some species".

Water availability

"Throughout the West, much of the water needed for agriculture, public supplies, and other uses comes from mountain snowpack, which melts in spring and summer and runs off into rivers and fills reservoirs. Over the past 50 years, snow has been melting earlier in the year, and more late-winter precipitation has been falling as rain instead of snow. Thus, water drains from the mountains earlier in the year. In many cases, dams capture the meltwater and retain it for use later in the year. But upstream of these dams, less water is available during droughts for ecosystems, fish, water-based recreation, and landowners who draw water directly from a flowing river".

"Rising temperatures also increase the rate at which water evaporates (or transpires) into the air from soils and plants. Unless rainfall increases to the same extent as evaporation, soils become drier. As a result, the soil retains more water when it rains, and thus less water runs off into rivers, streams, and reservoirs. During the last few decades, soils have become drier in most of the state, especially during summer. In the decades to come, rainfall during summer is more likely to decrease than increase in Colorado, and periods without rain are likely to become longer. All of these factors would tend to make droughts more severe in the future".

In particular, climate change has reduced the annual flow of Colorado River in the 21st century by almost 20 percent compared to the 20th. The decline has been linked to a reduction in the mountain snowpack through evaporation. Such a change is significant because the river supports 40 million people's water consumption throughout the West and $1 trillion in economic activity.

Agriculture

Use of cover crops is increasing. A collaboration between Boulder County Parks and Open Space and Colorado State University is working to develop  techniques to improve soil health and carbon sequestration. State level support for soil health is under discussion.

Changes in Colorado's climate are likely to have both positive and negative effects on farms and ranches. 

Depletion of the High Plains Aquifer will impact livestock and field crops in the eastern part of the state, which rely primarily on ground water pumped from the aquifer. "About 20 percent of crop land in eastern Colorado is irrigated. Higher evaporation rates will increase irrigation demands and reduce natural recharge of the aquifer, further lowering the water table. Reduced water availability will force some farms to switch from irrigation to dry land farming, which typically cuts yields in half. 

Increasingly severe heat waves would harm livestock. 

Even where ample water is available, higher temperatures would reduce yields of corn. 

Shorter winters are likely to reduce yields of winter wheat. Colorado is currently the fourth largest grower of winter wheat, which is an important source of food for livestock. Increased concentrations of carbon dioxide, however, may increase yields of wheat enough to offset the impact of higher temperatures. Warmer and shorter winters may allow for a longer growing season, which could allow two crops per year instead of one in some instances".

Wildfires

"Higher temperatures and drought are likely to increase the severity, frequency, and extent of wildfires in Colorado, which could harm property, livelihoods, and human health. In 2013, the Black Forest Fire burned 14,000 acres and destroyed over 500 homes. Wildfire smoke can reduce air quality and increase medical visits for chest pains, respiratory problems, and heart problems. The size and number of western forest fires have increased substantially since 1985".

Pests

"Warmer, drier conditions also make forests more susceptible to pests. Temperature controls the life cycle and winter mortality rates of pests such as the mountain pine beetle. With higher winter temperatures, some pests can persist year-round, and new pests and diseases may become established. Drought also reduces the ability of trees to mount a defense against attacks from beetles and other pests. A mountain pine beetle outbreak in 2006 covered nearly half of Colorado's forests and killed nearly five million lodgepole pines".

The West Nile Virus (WNV) is the leading cause of Mosquito-borne disease in Colorado. Most mosquito pools carrying WNV have been found in the front range of Colorado, located at the base of the foothills.  Living with mosquitoes during Colorado summers are a fact of life, however, there are ways to reduce exposure to mosquitoes. The Culex mosquito, the primary vector of WNV, lays its eggs in standing water and is most active during later, warmer summer conditions. Humans create areas that may collect several still pools of water that are attracting and creating more mosquitoes in our own backyard.  These pools can be prevented by draining any standing water that may be located in gutters, bird-baths, depressions in lawns, and any other place that collects water over time. Additionally, people who are outdoors and come into contact with mosquitoes in these areas often are most susceptible to WNV. Prevention methods include wearing mosquito spray and several layers of clothing to prevent mosquito bites from potential disease vectors. Simple acts such as these can reduce the amount of mosquitoes we interact with and, in-turn, reduce the odds of contracting West Nile.

Human health impacts of climate change

Climate change is expected to affect human health as changing environmental conditions promote the spread of infectious diseases. Models to predict future mosquito distribution indicate longer breeding seasons, which in turn, result in an increase in the abundance of mosquitoes with likely climate scenarios. Vector-borne diseases such as the West Nile Virus (WNV) are influenced by changes in weather conditions such as temperature, precipitation, and humidity, which create ideal breeding grounds for mosquitoes. Shifting hydrologic conditions can alter the incidence of vector-borne disease as an increase also affects the number of WNV cases seen. Increased precipitation and land wetness can affect the transmission of mosquito-borne diseases similar to WNV. Shifting hydrologic conditions can alter the incidence of vector-borne disease as increased precipitation and land wetness can affect the transmission of mosquito-borne diseases  As researchers have come to realize, biological systems are sensitive to small changes in seasonal temperatures, including the spread of infectious disease. Although changes in climate and weather patterns have the ability to contribute to more frequent outbreaks of WNV, local environmental conditions also play a role.

WNV is an infectious disease that is spread primarily by mosquitoes. WNV is concerning as it has the capability to cause inflammation in the brain and body tissues. Most individuals do not suffer from extreme symptoms, but mild symptoms include skin rashes, body aches, fevers, and headaches making it difficult to differentiate between a cold or allergic reaction when evaluating one's symptoms. Severe cases of WNV are neuroinvasive, causing symptoms such as encephalitis and meningitis. From 1999 to 2018, Colorado had the fourth-highest incidence of neuroinvasive WNV in the United States. 

Cases of WNV have been reported in Colorado every year since 2002. The 5-year historical average of WNV cases in Colorado indicates that most cases appear in late summer months, primarily August and September. Currently, there is no vaccine for WNV, and hospitalization is often required for patients experiencing symptoms. People often outdoors where mosquitoes are present should take precaution by wearing protective clothing and mosquito spray.

Climate mitigation efforts and greenhouse gases 

In December 2019, the Colorado Air Quality Control Commission strengthened inspection requirements for oil and gas production facilities and for pipelines in order to reduce greenhouse gas emissions.

Adaptation

Denver, Colorado 

The city of Denver has made recent strides to combat the threat of extreme wildfires and precipitation events. In the year 1996, a fire burned nearly 12,000 acres around Buffalo Creek, which serves as the main source of the city's water supply. Two months following this devastating wildfire, heavy thunderstorms caused flash floods in the burned area, having the effect of washing sediment into the city's reservoir. In fact, this event washed more sediment into the reservoir than had accumulated in the 13 years prior. Water treatment costs were estimated to be $20 million over the next decade following the event. Denver needed a plan to make sure that the city would not be devastated by future wildfire and flash flood events. DenverWater and the U.S. Forest Service Rocky Mountain Region are working together to restore more than 40,000 acres of National Forests lands through processes like reforestation, erosion control, and the decommissioning of roads. Further, Denver has installed sensors in the reservoirs in order to monitor the quality of the water and quantity of debris or sediment. These accomplishments will have the effect of building a more resilient Denver, Colorado towards the impending increase of extreme weather events such as wildfire and flooding.

See also
 List of U.S. states and territories by carbon dioxide emissions
 Plug-in electric vehicles in Colorado

References

Further reading
 —this chapter of the National Climate Assessment covers Arizona, California, Colorado, New Mexico, Nevada, and Utah

Colorado
Environment of Colorado